The women's freestyle skydiving event at the 2001 World Games in Akita was played from 17 to 19 August. A total of ten parachuters, from four nations, participated in the tournament. The competition took place at Ogata Athletic Field in Ōgata .

Competition format
A total of seven rounds were contested. The team with the most points is the winner.

Results

References

External links
 Results on IWGA website

Women's freestyle skydiving